Guy Montagu Butler (25 August 1899 – 22 February 1981) was a British sprinter, winner of the gold medal in the 4 × 400 m relay at the 1920 Summer Olympics. With four Olympic medals Guy Butler shares the British record for the number of medals in athletics with Sebastian Coe, Christine Ohuruogu, and Mo Farah.

Biography
Butler was born in Harrow, Middlesex, to Edward Montagu Butler and Gertrude Mary Fair. He was the grandson of academic Henry Montagu Butler and nephew of Sir James Ramsay Montagu Butler  and Sir Nevile Butler.

He attended the prestigious Harrow School, the Royal Military Academy Sandhurst, and Trinity College, Cambridge. His father also attended Harrow and competed in cricket and athletics at the national level. At the Antwerp Olympics in 1920, Butler won the silver medal in the individual 400 m and anchored the British 4 × 400 m relay team to a gold medal in 3:22.2. At the 1924 Summer Olympics, he won bronze in the 400 m and again anchored the British 4 × 400 m relay team, this time winning bronze in 3:17.4. In 1928 he became the first British track and field athlete to compete in three Olympics; he reached a 200 m quarterfinal, and retired shortly thereafter.

He also ran the  world record of 30.6 in 1926.

In retirement, Butler was a schoolmaster, then an athletics journalist, and a pioneer of filming athletes in action. He contributed to the design of the White City Stadium and worked as the athletics correspondent for The Morning Post until it was merged with The Daily Telegraph in 1937.

References

External links
 

1899 births
1981 deaths
People from Harrow, London
People from St Neots
British male sprinters
English male sprinters
Olympic athletes of Great Britain
Olympic gold medallists for Great Britain
Olympic silver medallists for Great Britain
Olympic bronze medallists for Great Britain
Athletes (track and field) at the 1920 Summer Olympics
Athletes (track and field) at the 1924 Summer Olympics
Athletes (track and field) at the 1928 Summer Olympics
English Olympic medallists
People educated at Harrow School
Alumni of Trinity College, Cambridge
Medalists at the 1924 Summer Olympics
Medalists at the 1920 Summer Olympics
Olympic gold medalists in athletics (track and field)
Olympic silver medalists in athletics (track and field)
Olympic bronze medalists in athletics (track and field)
Guy